Anthony Jennings may refer to:

Anthony Jennings (musician) (1945–1995), New Zealand harpsichordist, organist, choral and orchestral director, and academic
Anthony Jennings (American football) (born 1994), American college football quarterback

See also
Toni Jennings (born 1949), 16th lieutenant governor of Florida